Magoé District is a district of Tete Province in western Mozambique. Its administrative center is the town of Mpheende. The district is located in the north of the province, and borders with Zumbo District in the north, Marávia District in the northeast, Cahora-Bassa District in the east, and with Zimbabwe in the south and in the west. It had a population of 89,273 as of 2017.

Geography
The Zambezi crosses the district from west to east. Upstream of Songo, it is built up as the Lago Cahora Bassa, a water reservoir.

According to the Köppen climate classification, the climate of the district is that of hot steppe (BSh).

Demographics
As of 2005, 49% of the population of the district was younger than 15 years. 23% of the population spoke Portuguese. The most common mothertongue among the population was Cinyungwe. 72% were analphabetic, mostly women.

Administrative divisions
The district is divided into three postos, Mpheende, Chinhopo, and Mukumbura, which in total comprise six localities.

Economy
Less than 1% of the households in the district have access to electricity.

Agriculture
In the district, there are 9,000 farms which have on average  of land. The main agricultural products are corn, cowpea, peanut, and sweet potato.

Transportation
All roads are in a very bad state.

References

Districts in Tete Province